The K'nex Original Roller Coaster is a toy roller coaster, and the first toy roller coaster made by K'nex, and first released in 1994. The set comes with 2,400 pieces. Its proper name is the K'nex Roller Coaster, and its code number is "63030". Unlike other, later versions of coasters which commonly use a motor, this one, being the first K'Nex roller coaster ever made (hence its popular name) has a hand-crank to make the lift hill chain operable. A K’nex motor, sold separately, can also be used.

Description
It can be built in two versions, the "Spiral Version" and the "Loop Version" (also called the "Looper"). The Loop's dimensions are 8 feet long by 3 feet wide by 3 feet tall. The Spiral's dimensions are 5 feet long by 3 feet wide by 3 feet tall.

The Original K'nex Roller Coaster has a bulky and twisted layout. The Looper has a 3-foot-tall lift hill that, at the top, makes a right U-turn into the 45-degree drop. The car then goes into a vertical loop that is 1.5 feet tall. The car makes a 270-degree turn to the left, and then a 90-degree turn to the right, back to the lift hill.

The Spiral is simple. It, too, has a 3-foot-tall lift hill that goes into a 540-degree helix to the right. A brief 9-inch drop follows with a straightaway into a 180-degree turn to the right back to the lift hill.

External links
https://web.archive.org/web/20110927113600/http://www.knex.com/Building_Help/producthelp.php?view=rollercoaster

Construction toys